Eupatorium paludicola, also called swamp justiceweed, is a rare North American species of plant in the family Asteraceae, found only in the States of North Carolina and South Carolina in the southeastern United States.

Eupatorium paludicola was for many years considered part of E. leucolepis until chromosomal analysis showed it to be a distinct species.

Eupatorium paludicola is a perennial herb spreading by means of underground rhizomes. It has long, narrowly lance-shaped leaves. Hybrids have been reported between E. paludicola and E. mohrii.

References

paludicola
Flora of North Carolina
Flora of South Carolina
Plants described in 2007